Eighteen South Australian Railways K class (broad-gauge) locomotives were built by Beyer, Peacock and Company for the South Australian Railways (SAR) between 1878 and 1884. Despite having a fundamental design flaw that affected their original role as light-line passenger locomotives, they eventually performed shunting duties exclusively. They operated for six decades.

Need
At a time of fierce competition between the Australian colonies, a railway line was extended from Kapunda to Morgan on the River Murray, opening in 1878. The link allowed goods brought downstream on riverboats from New South Wales and Victoria to reach Port Adelaide for export more quickly and safely than by continuing on the river to the sea, since Morgan was only  by rail to Adelaide but  to the mouth of the river. Until the spread of other railway lines cut out most of the river traffic, the South Australian Railways operated as many as six goods trains in each direction every day on the Morgan line. 

William Thow, the Locomotive Engineer of the SAR, designed a 0-6-4 tank locomotive to handle traffic on the new line's lightly laid track. Four were delivered in 1879 from the UK manufacturer Beyer, Peacock and Company. At that time they were the most powerful locos on the SAR, with the exception of two 0-6-0 J class locomotives.

Shortcomings
The new locomotives experienced mechanical failures (broken crank axles, fracturing of gunmetal axleboxes and excessive tyre wear on the leading driving wheels) and after a year were moved to hauling goods and mixed trains other North Lines and the Port Adelaide line.

A major design weakness was the lack of a leading bogie ("pilot truck"), which led to frequent derailments, especially on the Adelaide Hills line, with its sharp curves, difficult gradients, and uncompensated track. A partial solution was to run the locomotives in reverse – i.e., with cab leading – so that the rear bogie led, providing guidance for the driving wheels. When that mode of operation predominated, the pilot ("cowcatcher") was moved to the bogie end. In their final role as shunting locomotives, the pilot was removed as a safety measure, since its presence made coupling and uncoupling difficult.

Deployment
Despite their shortcomings, the locomotive superintendent considered them a good design and concluded that the main problem was in the track. Fourteen more locos were ordered during the next five years. Running numbers for the 18 were allocated with gaps: starting with no. 34, their numbers spanned a range of 36. In a most unusual development, Thow designed a narrow gauge version of the class, the sole representative of which was delivered in 1884. It was allocated number 52, i.e. within that number range, and also classified as K class, despite the different gauge and being lighter and noticeably smaller in many respects – including the driving wheels, which at  diameter were  smaller than those of the broad-gauge K locomotives.

When they worked on longer country lines, such as to Terowie,  from Adelaide, where goods were transferred to the narrow gauge, a supplementary water tank wagon was attached. The downside was that the locomotives then had to work funnel-first because the only connection for the water was through a fitting attached to the rear of the engine.

Soon they could be seen again on the Morgan Line. One or two were lent or sold to contractors to help build the Hills line, but were quickly exchanged for machines that would reliably stay on the hills track. After some time with restrictions on where they could work, from about 1917 they were allowed on every broad-gauge line on the system. They occasionally worked trains on the Hills (or "South") line, but after the advent of the Q class, few saw service in the hills. When the SAR acquired the Glenelg Railway Company in 1899, the K class worked on the South Terrace (Adelaide) to Glenelg service. Nearer the end of their working lives, some were stationed at Port Adelaide for freight working in the area.

Lightly constructed lines to which the locomotives were suited were the Milang railway line and, especially in the 1920s, the Murraylands lines radiating from Tailem Bend. In the latter case the K class worked out of the Murray Bridge depot, and later the large depot at Tailem Bend; light servicing was carried out at both depots.

Modifications

During their six decades of service, the locomotives received a number of modifications, including rebuilds between 1893 and 1903. Changes were made to the cab roof and capacity of the coal bunkers; Ramsbottom safety valves replaced Salter type;  and Westinghouse brakes were fitted. None appears to have been fitted with a steam generator or electric light.

End
The service of this ultimately quite useful class of tank locomotive came to an end about 1936 after the larger and more powerful locomotives of Commissioner William Webb arrived in the late 1920s, freeing up medium-sized locos for lighter duties. However, cutting up did not follow immediately, and one was sold in 1940 to the Australian Paper Manufacturers factory at Maryvale, Victoria. The SAR also retained one for shunting at various places in the Adelaide conurbation, including Islington Railway Workshops. During the Second World War, three others were restored for similar service as an emergency measure. All four locomotives were cut up in 1956.

Gallery

Notes

References

Broad gauge locomotives in Australia
K
Beyer, Peacock locomotives
0-6-4T locomotives
Railway locomotives introduced in 1879